Fernando Tesón is an Argentine-American legal scholar who is known for his contributions to the philosophy of law (especially, the law of humanitarian intervention) and to neoclassical liberal theory.  He is the Tobias Simon Eminent Scholar at Florida State University College of Law.  His publications include Humanitarian Intervention: An Inquiry into Law and Morality (3rd ed fully revised and updated, Transnational Publishers 2005); Rational Choice and Democratic Deliberation (Cambridge University Press 2006) [with Guido Pincione]; A Philosophy of International Law (Westview Press 1998); and many articles in law, philosophy, and international relations journals and collections of essays.  Before entering academia, Professor Tesón was a career diplomat for the Argentina Foreign Ministry in Buenos Aires for four years. He resigned from the Argentine foreign service in 1981 to protest against the human rights abuses of the Argentine government and serves as permanent visiting professor, Universidad Torcuato Di Tella, Buenos Aires, Argentina. Tesón is also the founder, director, arranger, and bandoneón player, of Tango Sur, an Argentine tango band.

Since 2012 he has been a member of the Honorary Council of the Argentine Liberal Libertarian Party.

External links
 Florida State University College of Law faculty profile

American legal scholars
Florida State University faculty
Living people
Year of birth missing (living people)